Mount Works is a mountain, 1,780 m tall, rising just west of Horne Glacier and 2 nautical miles (3.7 km) southwest of Pilon Peak in the Everett Range, Concord Mountains Antarctica. Mapped by United States Geological Survey (USGS) from ground surveys and U.S. Navy air photos, 1960–62. Named by Advisory Committee on Antarctic Names (US-ACAN) for Lieutenant W.W. Works, U.S. Navy, pilot of P2V aircraft on photographic missions in Victoria Land and other parts of Antarctica in 1961–62 and 1962–63.

Mountains of Victoria Land
Pennell Coast